Podocarpus macrophyllus is a conifer in the genus Podocarpus, family Podocarpaceae. It is the northernmost species of the genus, native to southern Japan and southern and eastern China. In China, it is known as luóhàn sōng, which literally means "arhat pine".

Description

The cones are borne on a short stem, and have two to four scales, usually only one (sometimes two) fertile, each fertile scale bearing a single apical seed 10–15 mm. When mature, the scales swell up and become reddish purple, fleshy, and berry-like, 10–20 mm long; they are then eaten by birds, which disperse the seeds in their droppings.

P. macrophyllus occurs in forests, open thickets, and roadsides from near sea level to 1000 m above it.

Symbolism, cultivation, and uses
Kusamaki is the state tree of Chiba Prefecture, Japan. It is a popular large shrub or small tree in gardens, particularly in Japan and the Southeastern United States. The ripe cone arils are edible, though the seed should not be eaten. Because of its resistance to termites and water, inumaki is used for quality wooden houses in Okinawa Prefecture, Japan.

Buddhist pine is highly regarded as a feng shui tree in Hong Kong, giving it a very high market value. In recent years, the illegal digging of Buddhist pine has become a problem in the city.

This species can be trained as a bonsai.

Gallery

References

External links

Gymnosperm Database: Podocarpus macrophyllus
ITIS: Podocarpus macrophyllus
Seeds: Podocarpus macrophyllus

macrophyllus
Trees of Japan
Trees of China
Flora of Japan
Ornamental trees
Least concern plants